K'illima Parki (Aymara k'illima, k'illimi coal, parki slope, "coal slope", also spelled Killima Parqui) is a  mountain in the Andes of Bolivia. It is situated in the La Paz Department, Pacajes Province, Charaña Municipality. It lies south-west of the mountain Kunturiri. The peak south-west of K'illima Parki is named Wari Willk'i ("vicuña gap", Huariwillkhi).

See also 
 Wayra Lupi Qullu

References 

Mountains of La Paz Department (Bolivia)